is a retired Japanese high jumper. Her personal best jump was 1.95 metres, achieved in May 1987 in Fukuoka.

At the Olympic Games she finished eleventh in 1988 and seventh in 1992. She won the bronze medal at the 1987 Summer Universiade and 1990 Goodwill Games. On the regional level she won the 1986 and 1990 Asian Games, the latter in a new championship record of 1.94 metres.  In addition she won the bronze medals at the 1981 Asian Championships.

International competitions

Notes:
Results with a (q) indicate overall position in qualifying round.

References

1966 births
Living people
People from Niigata (city)
Sportspeople from Niigata Prefecture
Japanese female high jumpers
Olympic female high jumpers
Olympic athletes of Japan
Athletes (track and field) at the 1984 Summer Olympics
Athletes (track and field) at the 1988 Summer Olympics
Athletes (track and field) at the 1992 Summer Olympics
Asian Games gold medalists for Japan
Asian Games medalists in athletics (track and field)
Athletes (track and field) at the 1986 Asian Games
Athletes (track and field) at the 1990 Asian Games
Medalists at the 1986 Asian Games
Medalists at the 1990 Asian Games
Universiade medalists in athletics (track and field)
Universiade bronze medalists for Japan
Medalists at the 1987 Summer Universiade
Goodwill Games medalists in athletics
Competitors at the 1990 Goodwill Games
World Athletics Championships athletes for Japan
Japan Championships in Athletics winners
20th-century Japanese women